Moodlakatte Institute of Technology, Kundapura (MIT Kundapura, MitK) is a higher education institute located in Kundapur, Karnataka, India. it was founded by I. M. Jayarama Shetty in the year 2004. It is affiliated to Visveswaraiah Technological University and approved by All India Council for Technical Education (AICTE).

It is situated in Moodlakatte, about 200 meters from Kundapura railway station. Moodlakatte Institute of Technology is the product of the charitable trust Moodlakatte Nagarathna Bhujanga Shetty Trust (R.), situated in a beautiful natural environment of coastal karnataka, in front of Kundapura Railway Station in a small village called Moodlakatte.  It was established in the year 2004.

Courses
The  Institute offers 4 year bachelor's degree and 2 year master's degree programmes.

B.E. Degree courses:
Computer Science & Engineering
Artificial Intelligence and Machine Learning
Electronics & Communications Engineering
Mechanical Engineering
Civil Engineering

Postgraduate level:
MBA - Master of Business Administration

Students Associations
MEF - Mechanical Engineers Forum
SEA - Sparkling Electrical Association
TRICS - Tribunes of Computer Savviers
EMINENCE - E & C Association
FORCE - Civil Engineering Association

Hostels

Has elegantly built separate secured hostels for both boys and girls in the campus

See also
List of educational institutions in Mangalore
List of engineering colleges affiliated to Visvesvaraya Technological University

References

External links
 

Universities and colleges in Udupi district
Engineering colleges in Karnataka